"Tangled Up in Me" is a song recorded by Canadian musician Skye Sweetnam. It was released as the first single from Sweetnam's debut album Noise From the Basement on March 9, 2004, through Capitol Records. The song was written by Skye Sweetnam, James Robertson, Heather Mitchell, and Jimmy Harry. The song became Sweetnam's best-charting single in the United States after it was featured in an episode of MTV's Laguna Beach: The Real Orange County, reaching number 37 on the Billboard Mainstream Top 40. It also reached the top 40 in Italy.

Music video
The music video shows Sweetnam performing with her band, becoming tangled up in wires. The music video received play on Canada's MuchMusic channel.

Personnel
Personnel are taken from the US promo CD liner notes.

 Aslyn – writing
 James Harry – writing
 Skye Sweetnam – writing
 James Robertson – writing
 Skye Sweetnam – vocals

 Andrew Slater – production
 Julian Raymond – production
 Howard Willing – production, engineering
 Tom Lord-Alge – mixing
 Venus Management – management

Charts

Release history

References

2004 singles
2004 songs
Capitol Records singles
Music videos directed by Jake Nava
Skye Sweetnam songs
Songs written by Jamie Robertson
Songs written by Jimmy Harry